The 2003 Nigerian House of Representatives elections in Taraba State was held on April 12, 2003, to elect members of the House of Representatives to represent Taraba State, Nigeria.

Overview

Summary

Results

Bali/Gassol 
PDP candidate Dahiru Bako Gassol won the election, defeating other party candidates.

Jalingo/Yorro/Zing 
PDP candidate Alhassan Al-Gaddas won the election, defeating other party candidates.

Karim Lamido/Lau/Ardo-Kola 
PDP candidate Khamin Taurus won the election, defeating other party candidates.

Sardauna/Gashaka/Kurmi 
PDP candidate S.M. Nguroje won the election, defeating other party candidates.

Takuma/Donga/Ussa 
PDP candidate Emmanuel Bwacha won the election, defeating other party candidates.

Wukari/Ibi 
PDP candidate Ikenya Joel Danlami won the election, defeating other party candidates.

References 

Taraba State House of Representatives elections